Tyrannotitan is a genus of huge bipedal carnivorous dinosaur of the carcharodontosaurid family from the Aptian stage of the early Cretaceous period, discovered in Argentina. It is closely related to other giant predators like Carcharodontosaurus and especially Giganotosaurus as well as Mapusaurus.

Discovery and species 

 
Tyrannotitan chubutensis was described by Fernando E. Novas, Silvina de Valais, Pat Vickers-Rich, and Tom Rich in 2005. They are believed to have been from the Cerro Castaño Member, Cerro Barcino Formation (Aptian stage).

The holotype material was designated MPEF-PV 1156 and included partial dentaries, teeth, back vertebrae 3–8 and 11–14, proximal tail vertebrae, ribs and chevrons, a fragmentary scapulocoracoid, humerus, ulna, partial ilium, a nearly complete femur, fibula, and left metatarsal 2. Additional material (designated MPEF-PV 1157) included jugals, a right dentary, teeth, atlas vertebra, neck vertebra (?) 9, back vertebrae (?)7, 10, 13, fused sacral centra (5 total), an assortment of distal caudals, ribs, the right femur, a fragmentary left metatarsal 2, pedal phalanges 2-1, 2–2, and 3-3.

Description

It is geologically the oldest known giant carcharodontosaurid along with the more basal Acrocanthosaurus from North America (both found in Aptian-age rocks). Unlike other known carcharodontosaurids, this animal lacks skeletal pneumaticity extending into the sacral and caudal centra. The scapulocoracoid is fused, and much better developed than that of Giganotosaurus carolinii, yet the arm is very small. Most of the shaft of the scapula is missing.

The acromion curves about 90 degrees from the shaft axis, making it look vaguely tyrannosaurid-like. Whether the sharp difference between taxa is due to evolution or sexual dimorphism in poorly sampled populations of both species, has not been determined (the latter seems unlikely). A proximal caudal has a very tall neural spine (about twice the height of its centrum, judging by the figure). The base of the orbital fenestra is a notch of nearly 90 degrees into the body of the jugal, which contrasts with the rounded base restored for Giganotosaurus and agrees with Carcharodontosaurus favorably. The denticles on its teeth are "chisel-like", and are virtually identical to those of other carcharodontosaurids in having a wrinkled enamel surface, heavily serrated mesial and distal carinae, and labiolingually compressed (laterally flattened) crowns. Canale et al. recover Tyrannotitan as deeply nested within the tribe Giganotosaurini as its most basal member. Characteristics that unite the Giganotosaurini include the presence of a postorbital process on the jugal with a wide base, and a derived femur with a weak fourth trochanter and a shallow broad extensor groove at the distal end.

Classification
The following cladogram after Novas et al., 2013, shows the position of Tyrannotitan within Carcharodontosauridae.

References 

Carcharodontosaurids
Aptian life
Early Cretaceous dinosaurs of South America
Cretaceous Argentina
Fossils of Argentina
Cerro Barcino Formation
Fossil taxa described in 2005
Taxa named by Fernando Novas
Taxa named by Patricia Vickers-Rich
Taxa named by Tom Rich